The Bistrița Mountains are mountain ranges in northern central Romania.

Geologically these ranges are considered part of the Inner Eastern Carpathians group of the Eastern Carpathians.  Within Romania, however, it is traditional to divide the Eastern Carpathians in Romanian territory into three geographical groups (north, center, south), instead in Outer and Inner Eastern Carpathians. The Romanian categorization is indicated below.

The Bistrița mountain range consist of the following mountains.
 Bistrița Mountains (Munții Bistriței) per se, comprising 
 Pietrosul Massif (Masivul Pietrosul; literally: Rocky Massif)
 Budacul Massif (Masivul Budacul)
 Ceahlău Massif (Masivul Ceahlău)
with the latter sometimes considered a distinct range.  In Romania these are considered part of the central Carpathians of Moldavia and Transylvania (Munții Carpați Moldo-Transilvani), or "MMT"
 Mestecăniș Ridge (Obcina Mestecăniș).  In Romania these are considered part of the northern Carpathians of Maramureș and Bukovina (Munții Carpați ai Maramureșului și Bucovinei), or "MMB"
 Dorna Depression (Depresiunea Dornei) MMB
 Giumalău-Rarău Mountains (Munții Giumalău-Rarău) MMB
 Giurgeu Mountains (Munții Giurgeului) MMT
 Hășmaș Mountains (Munții Hășmașu Mare) MMT

See also
 Romanian Carpathians

External links
 Munții Rarău și Giumalău, description and hiking guide

Mountain ranges of the Eastern Carpathians
Mountain ranges of Romania